"Herald of Freedom" was an essay by Henry David Thoreau, published in The Dial in 1844, that praised Herald of Freedom, the journal of the New Hampshire Anti-Slavery Society, and its editor, Nathaniel P. Rogers. After Rogers died, Thoreau revised the essay and republished it.

On-line sources 
 
 "Herald of Freedom" at The Picket Line.

Printed sources 
 My Thoughts Are Murder to the State by Henry David Thoreau
 The Higher Law: Thoreau on Civil Disobedience and Reform
 Collected Essays and Poems by Henry David Thoreau

1844 essays
Essays by Henry David Thoreau
Works originally published in The Dial